Joshua Taylor is a film and television actor. He is also a film director and film producer.

Taylor is perhaps best known for his appearance as Blueberry Pirate in the space Western musical film The American Astronaut (2001).

Career 

In addition to his appearance in The American Astronaut, Taylor has appeared in at least three other films and one television production. He also directed the documentary film Dita and the Family Business (2001) and acted as a producer on The American Astronaut.

Filmography

References

External links 
 

Living people
Year of birth missing (living people)
American male film actors
American film directors
American film producers
American male television actors